Rožično is a small dispersed settlement in the Tuhinj Valley in the Municipality of Kamnik in the Upper Carniola region of Slovenia. It lies along the side valley of Rožičnica Creek, a tributary of the Nevljica River.

References

External links

Rožično on Geopedia

Populated places in the Municipality of Kamnik